Mud Bay (Lingít: Ḵutlkw G̱eeyí) is a census-designated place (CDP) in Haines Borough, Alaska, United States. At the 2010 census the population was 212, up from 137 at the 2000 census.

Geography
Mud Bay is located in central Haines Borough at  (59.148234, -135.353359), on the Chilkat Peninsula. It is bordered to the east by the Chilkoot Inlet and to the west by the Chilkat Inlet, and extends south to the end of the peninsula at Seduction Point, where the two inlets join to form the Lynn Canal. To the north the CDP is bordered by the community of Haines. Chilkat State Park occupies the southern end of the peninsula.

Demographics

Mud Bay first appeared on the 2000 U.S. Census as a census-designated place (CDP). This is not to be confused with another Mud Bay, which is a suburb to the northwest of Ketchikan, which reported on the 1960-70 censuses.

As of the census of 2000, there were 137 people, 66 households, and 35 families residing in the CDP. The population density was 11.0 people per square mile (4.2/km2). There were 110 housing units at an average density of 8.8/sq mi (3.4/km2). The racial makeup of the CDP was 91.97% White, 2.19% Native American, 0.73% from other races, and 5.11% from two or more races. 2.19% of the population were Hispanic or Latino of any race.

There were 66 households, out of which 21.2% had children under the age of 18 living with them, 50.0% were married couples living together, 3.0% had a female householder with no husband present, and 45.5% were non-families. 27.3% of all households were made up of individuals, and 3.0% had someone living alone who was 65 years of age or older. The average household size was 2.08 and the average family size was 2.61.

In the CDP, the population was spread out, with 16.1% under the age of 18, 2.2% from 18 to 24, 43.1% from 25 to 44, 32.8% from 45 to 64, and 5.8% who were 65 years of age or older. The median age was 43 years. For every 100 females, there were 107.6 males. For every 100 females age 18 and over, there were 113.0 males.

The median income for a household in the CDP was $44,750, and the median income for a family was $56,250. Males had a median income of $53,750 versus $19,583 for females. The per capita income for the CDP was $24,720. There were none of the families and 9.7% of the population living below the poverty line, including no under eighteens and none of those over 64.

References

Census-designated places in Alaska
Census-designated places in Haines Borough, Alaska
Populated coastal places in Alaska on the Pacific Ocean